AMG-41 (part of the AM cannabinoid series)  is an analgesic drug which is a cannabinoid agonist. It is a derivative of Δ8-THC substituted with a cyclopropyl group on the C1'-position of the C3-alkyl side chain. AMG-41 is a potent agonist at both CB1 and CB2, with a Ki of 0.44 nM at CB1 vs 0.86 nM at CB2.

See also 
 AMG-3
 AMG-36

References 

Cannabinoids
Benzochromenes
Phenols